Johan Michael Lund (2 September 1753 – 15 May 1824) was a Norwegian lawyer from Bergen. From 1786 to 1805 he was Lawman (Faroese: Løgmaður) (prime minister) of the Faroe Islands.

Later, he moved back to Norway, and from 1807 he was burgomaster (Norwegian: Borgermester) of Bergen. From 1809 he was a judge of the Dano-Norwegian supreme court. He died on 15 May 1824, aged 70.

References

1753 births
1824 deaths
Politicians from Bergen
18th-century Norwegian lawyers
Lawmen of the Faroe Islands
19th-century Norwegian judges